Kavin Bharti Mittal is an Indian internet entrepreneur, He is the founder and CEO of Hike, the company behind Indian unicorn Hike Messenger and the Rush Gaming Universe (RGU), a mobile gaming application, which has plans to come on-chain in 2022 with 2-layer blockchain platform, Polygon. The RGU announced its latest round of funding from Jump Capital, Tribe Capital and Republic Crypto.

Early life
Mittal is the son of entrepreneur Sunil Mittal, an Indian billionaire entrepreneur and founder of Bharti Enterprises, and Nyna Mittal. He graduated in Electronics and Electrical Engineering from the University of York and completed his Master's in Electrical and Electronics Engineering and Management from the Imperial College London. Kavin interned at McLaren Racing, Google and Goldman Sachs while studying at Imperial College London. At McLaren Racing, he helped the Formula1 team embed a technology that would show the track flags on steering wheels.

From an early age, Mittal had a keen interest for coding. He started coding during his college days and was building apps for big platforms like Facebook and Apple Inc. When the iPhone first launched in 2007, followed by the App Store in 2008, Mittal, still in his final year at college, brought together a few friends to build his first App for the iOS platform – MoviesNow, a movie-ticketing app in collaboration with movietickets.com.

Career
After moving back to India, Mittal founded Hike in 2012 as an Indian internet company that developed social communication and entertainment products. From 2012 to 2018, Hike built the Hike Messenger SuperApp centred around messaging to bring India, a mobile-first population, online. At its peak in 2018, Hike had reached more than 30 million monthly active users and had raised over $250 million in capital from investors such as Tiger Global, Tencent, SoftBank & Foxconn.

In 2019, Hike decided to shut down the app  citing that the market dynamic had shifted with cheaper data coming in and smartphone prices dipping sharply. According to Mittal, the smartphone itself was now a SuperApp, undercutting the need for a SuperApp like Hike in the Indian market.

After Hike's closure, Mittal pivoted the company to focus on building the Rush Gaming Universe, a mobile gaming application. In August 2021, they announced an undisclosed round of funding led by Tinder cofounder Justin Mateen.  The round also saw participation from SoftBank Vision Fund CEO Rajeev Misra, Tinder co-founder Sean Rad, Flipkart co-founder Binny Bansal, CRED founder Kunal Shah, and others.

In February 2022, Mittal announced that Polygon had joined Hike's list of investors and partners, with the Rush Gaming Universe confirming its rumored plans for blockchain gaming. In May 2022, Mittal's Hike announced an undisclosed round of funding from web3 investors Jump Capital, Tribe Capital and Republic Crypto, the blockchain investment arm of Republic Capital.

Public profile 
Kavin Mittal was featured in the Forbes 30 Under 30 list in 2017.  Mittal was also a part of 35 under 35 Entrepreneur magazine 2016 list.

See also
 List of Internet entrepreneurs.

References

External links

 Kavin Bharti Mittal on Forbes

Indian chief executives
Alumni of Imperial College London
Living people
1987 births
Aggarwal
Punjabi Hindus